The Pella curse tablet is a text written in a distinct Doric Greek idiom, found in Pella, the ancient capital of Macedon, in 1986. Ιt contains a curse or magic spell (katadesmos) inscribed on a lead scroll, dated to the first half of the 4th century BC (circa 375–350 BC). It was published in the Hellenic Dialectology Journal in 1993. It is one of four known texts that may represent a local dialectal form of ancient Greek in Macedonia, all of them identifiable as Doric. These suggest that a Doric Greek dialect was spoken in Macedonia, as was previously proposed based on the West Greek forms of names found in Macedonia. As a result, the Pella curse tablet has been forwarded as an argument that the Ancient Macedonian language was a dialect of North-Western Greek, and one of the Doric dialects.

The spell was written by a woman, possibly named Dagina, and was intended to cause her former lover to marry her.

Interpretation

It is a magic spell or love charm written by a woman, possibly named Dagina (Ancient Greek: Δαγίνα), whose lover Dionysophōn (Διονυσοφῶν, gen.: Διονυσοφῶντος) is apparently about to marry Thetima (Θετίμα, "she who honors the gods"; the Attic Greek form is Theotimē - Θεοτίμη). She invokes "Makron and the demons" (parkattithemai makrōni kai [tois] daimosi – παρκαττίθεμαι μάκρωνι καὶ [τοῖς] δαίμοσι; in Attic, παρκαττίθεμαι is parakatatithemai - παρακατατίθεμαι) to cause Dionysophon to marry her instead of Thetima. Dagina also wants him never to marry another woman, unless she herself recovers and unrolls the scroll. She wishes for herself to grow old by the side of Dionysophon.

The tablet is also described as a "mixed curse" due to the supplicative nature of the appeal. For example, the word ΕΡΗΜΑ or "abandoned" is quite common in appeals to divine powers.

Katadesmoi or defixiones were spells written on non-perishable material, such as lead, stone or baked clay, and were secretly buried to ensure their physical integrity, which would then guarantee the permanence of their intended effects. The language is a distinct form of North-West Greek, and the low social status of its writer, as (arguably) evidenced by her vocabulary and belief in magic, strongly suggests that a unique form of West Greek was spoken by lower-class people in Pella at the time the tablet was written. This should not, however, be taken to indicate that only those of middling or low social status practiced magic in the Ancient Greek world; quite wealthy individuals might also use lead katadesmoi (curse tablets) for love, revenge, and to bind their opponents in athletic contests.

Text and translation

Greek
1. [ΘΕΤΙ]ΜΑΣ ΚΑΙ ΔΙΟΝΥΣΟΦΩΝΤΟΣ ΤΟ ΤΕΛΟΣ ΚΑΙ ΤΟΝ ΓΑΜΟΝ ΚΑΤΑΓΡΑΦΩ ΚΑΙ ΤΑΝ ΑΛΛΑΝ ΠΑΣΑΝ ΓΥ-
2. [ΝΑΙΚ]ΩΝ ΚΑΙ ΧΗΡΑΝ ΚΑΙ ΠΑΡΘΕΝΩΝ ΜΑΛΙΣΤΑ ΔΕ ΘΕΤΙΜΑΣ ΚΑΙ ΠΑΡΚΑΤΤΙΘΕΜΑΙ ΜΑΚΡΩΝΙ ΚΑΙ
3. [ΤΟΙΣ] ΔΑΙΜΟΣΙ ΚΑΙ ΟΠΟΚΑ ΕΓΩ ΤΑΥΤΑ ΔΙΕΛΕΞΑΙΜΙ ΚΑΙ ΑΝΑΓΝΟΙΗΝ ΠΑΛΕΙΝ ΑΝΟΡΟΞΑΣΑ
4. [ΤΟΚΑ] ΓΑΜΑΙ ΔΙΟΝΥΣΟΦΩΝΤΑ ΠΡΟΤΕΡΟΝ ΔΕ ΜΗ ΜΗ ΓΑΡ ΛΑΒΟΙ ΑΛΛΑΝ ΓΥΝΑΙΚΑ ΑΛΛ᾽ Η ΕΜΕ
5. [ΕΜΕ Δ]Ε ΣΥΝΚΑΤΑΓΗΡΑΣΑΙ ΔΙΟΝΥΣΟΦΩΝΤΙ ΚΑΙ ΜΗΔΕΜΙΑΝ ΑΛΛΑΝ ΙΚΕΤΙΣ ΥΜΩΝ ΓΙΝΟ-
6. [ΜΑΙ ΦΙΛ]ΑΝ ΟΙΚΤΙΡΕΤΕ ΔΑΙΜΟΝΕΣ ΦΙΛ[ΟΙ] ΔΑΓΙΝΑΓΑΡΙΜΕ ΦΙΛΩΝ ΠΑΝΤΩΝ ΚΑΙ ΕΡΗΜΑ ΑΛΛΑ
7. [ΤΑΥΤ]Α ΦΥΛΑΣΣΕΤΕ ΕΜΙΝ ΟΠΩΣ ΜΗ ΓΙΝΗΤΑΙ ΤΑ[Υ]ΤΑ ΚΑΙ ΚΑΚΑ ΚΑΚΩΣ ΘΕΤΙΜΑ ΑΠΟΛΗΤΑΙ
8. [....]ΑΛ[-].ΥΝΜ .. ΕΣΠΛΗΝ ΕΜΟΣ ΕΜΕ Δ᾽ ΕΥ[Δ]ΑΙΜΟΝΑ ΚΑΙ ΜΑΚΑΡΙΑΝ ΓΕΝΕΣΤΑΙ
9. [-]ΤΟ[.].[-].[..]..Ε.Ε.Ω[?]Α.[.]Ε..ΜΕΓΕ [-]

English
1. Of [Theti]ma and Dionysophon the ritual wedding and the marriage I bind by a written spell, and of all other
2. wo[men], both widows and maidens, but of Thetima in particular, and I entrust to Makron* and
3. [the] daimones, and (only) when I should dig up again and unroll and read this,
4. [?] that she might wed Dionysophon, but not before, for I wish him to take no other woman than me,
5. and that [I] grow old with Dionysophon, and no one else. I [am] your supplicant:
6. Have pity on [Phil?]a*, dear daimones, for I am (a) dagina? of all my dear ones and I am abandoned.
7. But guard [this] for my sake so that these things do not happen, and wretched Thetima perishes miserably.
8.  ...  but that I become happy and blessed.

Points of interpretation
"Makron" (line 2) is most probably the name of the dead man in whose grave the tablet was deposited.  This was commonly done in the belief that the deceased would "convey" the message to the Chthonic spirits of the Greek underworld (the "daimones" in lines 3 and 6).
The missing word in line 6 between "I am your supplicant" and "have pity" (here reconstructed as [Phil?]a) is carved at the edge of the tablet and the only things we can read of it are that it is a short word that ends in-AN. "PHILAN" is a likely reconstruction, but by no means the only one possible.  If true, the word "PHILAN" could equally well be either the personal name "Phila" or the feminine adjective "phila", "friend" or "dear one".  In the latter case, an alternative reading of line 6 would be: "Have pity on your dear one, dear daimones". In the former case, a personal name would be perfectly placed but, as the name of the person who wrote the curse is not mentioned elsewhere, it is impossible to know with certainty what the missing word is.
The word "DAGINA" (line 6) is inexplicable and previously unattested, even as a personal name.  The alternative has been suggested by Dubois, that it is a misspelling, and that the writer intended to write "dapina" (the difference between Γ and Π being a single stroke).  If true, this may mean that dapina is an (also unattested) Macedonian rendering of what would be written "ταπεινή", tapeinē (humble, lowly, brought low), in standard Attic.  In this case the inscription reads: "for I am lowly from all my dear ones and abandoned" etc.  Another possibility is that Dagina is perhaps related to δαγύς, a doll or puppet, especially as used in magic (cf. LSJ p. 364). Similarly, ΙΜΕ is also unexplained, but seems to be taken as a misspelling of ΕΜΙ (εμι) (i.e., Attic εἰμι), "I am."

Dating
According to D. R. Jordan (Duke University), the tablet has been dated to the "Mid-IV [century] or slightly earlier".

Significance
The discovery of the Pella curse tablet, according to Olivier Masson, substantiates the view that the ancient Macedonian language was a form of North-West Greek:

"Yet in contrast with earlier views which made of it {i.e. Macedonian} an Aeolic dialect (O. Hoffmann compared Thessalian) we must by now think of a link with North-West Greek (Locrian, Aetolian, Phocidian, Epirote). This view is supported by the recent discovery at Pella of a curse tablet (4th cent. BC), which may well be the first 'Macedonian' text attested (provisional publication by E. Voutyras; cf. the Bulletin Epigraphique in Rev. Et. Grec. 1994, no. 413); the text includes an adverb "opoka" which is not Thessalian."

Of the same opinion is James L. O'Neil's (University of Sydney) presentation at the 2005 Conference of the Australasian Society for Classical Studies, entitled "Doric Forms in Macedonian Inscriptions" (abstract):

"A fourth‐century BC curse tablet from Pella shows word forms which are clearly Doric, but a different form of Doric from any of the west Greek dialects of areas adjoining Macedon. Three other, very brief, fourth century inscriptions are also indubitably Doric. These show that a Doric dialect was spoken in Macedon, as we would expect from the West Greek forms of Greek names found in Macedon. And yet later Macedonian inscriptions are in Koine avoiding both Doric forms and the Macedonian voicing of consonants. The native Macedonian dialect had become unsuitable for written documents."

Professor Johannes Engels of the University of Cologne argues that the Pella curse tablet provides evidence to support that Macedonian was a North-West Greek dialect:
"Another very important testimony comes from the so-called Pella curse tablet. This is a text written in Doric Greek and found in 1986 [...] This has been judged to be the most important ancient testimony to substantiate that Macedonian was a north-western Greek and mainly a Doric dialect."

See also

Ancient Macedonian language
Doric Greek
Phiale of Megara

References

Citations

Sources

Further reading

External links
PHI Greek Inscriptions (Epigraphical Database): Makedonia (Bottiaia) — Pella — ca. 380-350 BC, SEG 43:434
"Love Charms In Their Social Context" – Prof. Radcliffe G. Edmonds III, Bryn Mawr College

4th-century BC manuscripts
1986 archaeological discoveries
Ancient Pella
Archaeological artifacts
Archaeological discoveries in Greece
Curse tablets
Doric Greek inscriptions
Greek religion inscriptions
Occult texts
Religion in ancient Macedonia
Votive offering
European witchcraft